Vissefjärda is a locality situated in Emmaboda Municipality, Kalmar County, Sweden. Vissefjärda is also the name of the parish.

Vissefjärda Church

Vissefjärda Church  (Vissefjärda kyrka) dates to February 28, 1773. It is associated with the parish of Emmaboda in the Diocese of Växjö. The stone church stands where the Lyckebyån River runs into lake Kyrksjön.
The chandeliers are of varying age with the oldest dating to 1691.  The altarpiece was painted by Pehr Hörberg in 1795. The pulpit is from 1842. The organ is acquired from Kalmar Cathedral in 1883. The wooden church bell tower was erected in 1774.

On an island opposite the church lies church memorial park (Minneslunden). Opposite the church, on the other side of the Lyckebyån, are church stables for some 200 horses. These were built in 1855 and in use until the late 1930s. The old county road ran along the stables and then crossed the river via an arched bridge, which was demolished in 1937. Since 1948 the stables accommodate a local museum with old tools and household items from the area, and it is the location for Midsummer festivities.

Historical Society
Vissefjarda Local History Society (Vissefjärda Hembygdsförening) was formed on April 18, 1937. Since 1950, the association has published an annual review, I Dackebygd. Besides the church stables and the historic Kyrkeby Distillery (Kyrkeby Bränneri) which from the 1770s, the association also takes care of some older houses and cottages in the parish.

Population and area
Vissefjärda's municipality is 115 ha. Its population varied only slightly since 1960.
1960: 623
1965: 688
1970: 736
1975: 770
1980: 757
1990: 746
1995: 714
2000: 695
2005: 673
2010: 670

Migrants from Vissefjärda in the twentieth century to the United States ended up in Illinois and Kansas.

Other services
Vissefjärda has a primary school of about 100 students. Extensive renovations in 2008 included the addition of a library. There is a kindergarten, Panther, with about 50 children, and a preschool, Lillgården, for children up to five years.

The Emmaboda golf club owns a golf course with 18 holes, Björketorp, at Kyrksjön. The local sports club, VGIF, was established in 1929, and has football, table tennis, gymnastics, and tennis.

Notable residents
Nils Dacke (1510-1543), leader of a mid-16th century peasant revolt in Småland and  popular upraising  against King Gustav Vasa.
Lars Gullin (1928-1976), jazz musician  and saxophonist
Theodor Wisén (1835-1892), Rector of Lund University, scholar of Old Norse and other Scandinavian languages

Gallery

References

External links

Emmaboda parish website
Vissefjärda Hembygdsförening website
Kyrkeby Bränneri website

Populated places in Kalmar County
Populated places in Emmaboda Municipality